North Shore is an electoral district of the Legislative Assembly in the Australian state of New South Wales, located on Sydney's lower North Shore. It is currently held by  MP Felicity Wilson.

History
North Shore was originally created as a five-member electorate with the introduction of proportional representation in 1920, replacing Middle Harbour, Mosman, St Leonards and Willoughby and named after the North Shore of Sydney Harbour.  It was abolished in 1927 and replaced by Lane Cove, Manly, Mosman, Neutral Bay, North Sydney and Willoughby.  It was recreated in 1981, replacing Kirribilli.

It was originally expected to be a very safe Liberal seat; northern Sydney has been the power base for the Liberals and their predecessors for over a century.  However, it was held by independents from 1981 to 1991—most notably Ted Mack from 1981 to 1988.  The Liberals did not take the seat until 1991, but have held it with virtually no difficulty since then.

While  frequently runs dead in northern Sydney, North Shore is very unfriendly territory for Labor even by northern Sydney standards. Labor has never tallied more than 37 percent of the two-party vote. In the last four elections, Labor candidates have been pushed into third place, and have struggled to get to 20 percent of the primary vote.

Members for North Shore

Election results

References

Electoral districts of New South Wales
1920 establishments in Australia
North Shore
1927 disestablishments in Australia
North Shore
1981 establishments in Australia
North Shore